Bellingham High School, or BHS is a five-year public high school located in the town of Bellingham, Massachusetts, United States. BHS is one of two high schools in the town of Bellingham.

History 
This building was opened in 2001 for grades 912, thus making the old high school become the middle school for grades 58. The three elementary schools in Bellingham went from the grades kindergarten to sixth, to now kindergarten to fourth. 
As of 2015, the high school has transitioned to grades 812 as the middle school is now grades 47 and the two remaining elementary schools South Elementary and Stall Brook Elementary are now K3.

Notable alumni 
 Ricky Santos, NFL quarterback for the Kansas City Chiefs, also played for various CFL teams.
 Debbie Mueller, only American winner of Dublin Marathon, pioneer female road runner

References 

 http://www.bellingham.k12.ma.us/hs/Athletics/athletics.htm 
 http://www.bellingham.k12.ma.us/hs/default.htm

Schools in Norfolk County, Massachusetts
Public high schools in Massachusetts
Educational institutions established in 2001
School buildings completed in 2001
2001 establishments in Massachusetts